Don Burke (born 1947) is an Australian television presenter and horticulturist.

Don Burke or Donald Burke may also refer to:

 Donald Burke, an American infectious diseases researcher
 Don Burke (American football) (born February 7, 1926), an American football player